Luck of the Navy is a 1938 British comedy thriller film directed by Norman Lee and starring Geoffrey Toone, Judy Kelly and Clifford Evans. Shot at Elstree Studios it was based on the play The Luck of the Navy by Mrs Clifford Mills and is also known by the alternative title of North Sea Patrol.

Plot
With Britain on the brink of war, an enemy spy plans to steal secret documents and lay the blame on Clive Stanton.

Cast
 Geoffrey Toone as Commander Clive Stanton
 Judy Kelly as Cynthia Maybridge
 Clifford Evans as Lieutenant Peel
 John Wood as Sub Lieutenant Eden
 Albert Burdon as Noakes
 Alf Goddard as Tomkins
 Henry Oscar as Perrin
 Kenneth Kent as Colonel Suvaroff
 Marguerite Allan as Anna Suvaroff
 Edmund Breon as Admiral Maybridge
 Doris Hare as Mrs Maybridge
 Daphne Raglan as Dora Maybridge
 Olga Lindo as Mrs Rance
 Diana Beaumont as Millie
 Leslie Perrins as Briggs
 Frank Fox as François
 Joan Fred Emney as Cook
 Ronald Adam as Enemy Ship's Captain

References

Bibliography
 Wood, Linda. British Films, 1927-1939. British Film Institute, 1986.

External links

1938 films
1930s comedy thriller films
Films shot at Associated British Studios
1930s English-language films
Films directed by Norman Lee
British comedy thriller films
British black-and-white films
1938 comedy films
Seafaring films
1930s British films